Andranofasika is a rural commune in Madagascar. It belongs to the district of Ambato-Boeni, which is a part of Boeny Region. The population of the commune was estimated to be 16,971 in 2018.

Only primary schooling is available. The majority 85% of the population of the commune are farmers, while an additional 10% receives their livelihood from raising livestock. The most important crop is cassava, while other important products are maize and rice.  Services provide employment for 2% of the population. Additionally fishing employs 3% of the population.

National Parks
The office of the Ankarafantsika National Park is situated at 4 km from Andranofasika in Ampijoroa, Marovoay.

References

Populated places in Boeny